Interference Ripples are a type of sedimentary structure made up of two sets of ripples formed at right-angles to each other as a result of there being two dominant paleocurrents. These ripples may be formed in the beds of intermittent streams.

References

Further reading
 Prothero, D. R. and Schwab, F., 1996, Sedimentary Geology, pg. 43-64, 

Sedimentology
Patterned grounds
Sedimentary structures